Santa Josefina (Portuguese for Saint Josephine) is a village in the southern part of São Tomé Island in São Tomé and Príncipe. Its population is 17 (2008 est.). It lies 4 km north of Porto Alegre.

Population history

References

Populated places in Caué District